Stoke City Football Club is an English professional association football club based in Stoke-on-Trent, Staffordshire.

Founded as Stoke Ramblers in 1863 the club changed its name to Stoke in 1878 and then to Stoke City in 1925 after Stoke-on-Trent was granted city status. They are the second oldest professional football club in the world, after Notts County, and are one of the founding members of the Football League. They currently play in the Football League Championship, the second tier of English football. They have never been lower than the third tier.

Their first, and to date only major trophy, the League Cup was won in 1972, when the team beat Chelsea 2–1. The club's highest league finish in the top division is 4th, which was achieved in the 1935–36 and 1946–47 seasons. Stoke played in the FA Cup Final in 2011, finishing runners-up to Manchester City and have reached three FA Cup semi-finals; in 1899 then consecutively in 1971 and 1972. Stoke have competed in European football on three occasions, firstly in 1972–73 then in 1974–75 and most recently in 2011–12. The club has won the Football League Trophy twice, in 1992 and in 2000. The club's record appearance maker is Eric Skeels, who made 597 appearances between 1959 and 1976, and the club's record goalscorer is John Ritchie, who scored 176 goals in 351 appearances from 1962 to 1975.

Honours

League
Football League Championship
Runners-up: 2007–08

Football League Second Division: 3
Champions: 1932–33, 1962–63, 1992–93
Runners-up: 1921–22
Third Place: (Promoted) 1978–79
Play-off Winners: 2001–02

Football League Third Division North: 1
Champions: 1926–27

Football Alliance: 1
Champions: 1890–91

Birmingham & District League: 1
Champions: 1910–11

Southern League Division Two: 2
Champions:1909–10, 1914–15
Runners-up: 1910–11

Cups
FA Cup
Runners-up: 2010–11
Semi-finalists: 1898–99, 1970–71 (3rd place), 1971–72 (4th place)

League Cup: 1
Winners: 1971–72
Runners-up: 1963–64

Football League Trophy: 2
Winners: 1991–92, 1999–2000

Watney Cup: 1
Winners: 1973

Staffordshire Senior Cup: 15
Winners: 1877–78, 1878–79, 1903–04 (shared), 1913–14, 1933–34, 1964–65, 1968–69 (shared), 1970–71, 1974–75, 1975–76, 1981–82, 1992–93, 1994–95, 1998–99, 2016–17
Runners-up: 1882–83, 1885–86, 1894–95, 1900–01, 1902–03, 2002–03, 2005–06, 2010–11

Birmingham Senior Cup: 2
Winners: 1901, 1914
Runners-up: 1910, 1915, 1920, 1921

Isle of Man Trophy: 3
Winners: 1987, 1991, 1992
Runners-up: 1985

Bass Charity Vase: 5
Winners: 1980, 1991, 1992, 1995, 1998
Runners-up: 1890, 1894, 1990, 1996

Player records

Appearances
 Most appearances in total (League & Cup) – 597 Eric Skeels (1959–76)
 Most League appearances – 507 Eric Skeels (1959–76)
 Most appearances in total (Including war-time) – 675 John McCue (1940–60)
 Most Consecutive Appearances – 148 Tony Allen (1960–63)
 Youngest Player – Emre Tezgel 16 years, 112 days v Leyton Orient 9 January 2022
 Oldest Player – Stanley Matthews 50 years, 5 days v Fulham 6 February 1965
 First Substitute –  Keith Bebbington in 1965 who replaced Dennis Viollet
 Most Substitute Appearances For The Club – 98 Peter Crouch (2011–2019)

Top 20 most appearances

Goalscoring

 Leading Goalscorer (League & Cup) – 176 John Ritchie (1963–75)
 Leading Goalscorer (League only)  – 140 Freddie Steele (1934–49)
 Leading Goalscorer (Including war-time)  – 282 Tommy Sale (1930–47)
 Leading Goalscorer (FA Cup) – 19 Freddie Steele
 Leading Goalscorer (League Cup)  – 18 John Ritchie
 Leading Goalscorer (Premier League only)  – 44 Peter Crouch
 Most Goals In a Season  – 38 Charlie Wilson & Arthur Griffiths
 Most Goals In a Season (League only)  – 33 Freddie Steele
 Most Goals In a single match  – 7 Neville Coleman v Lincoln City 23 February 1957
 Most matches Scored In Consecutively  – 7 (7 Goals) Mike Sheron

Top 20 overall goalscorers

Internationals
 Most capped player  – 81 Glenn Whelan
 First player to be capped  –  Edward Johnson for England 1880
 First Scottish player to be capped  – Tommy Hyslop 1896
 First Welsh player to be capped  – Mart Watkins 1902
 First Irish player to be capped  – James Sheridan 1905

Transfers
 Record transfer fee paid – £18.3 million to Porto for Giannelli Imbula February 2016
 Record transfer fee received – £20 million from West Ham United for Marko Arnautović July 2017

Progression of record fee paid

Progression of record fee received

All-Time XI & Hall of Fame members
In the final match of the 2012–13 season, as part of the club's official celebration of their 150th anniversary, supporters cast votes to determine the greatest ever Stoke City team.

 Gordon Banks (1967–72)
 Jackie Marsh (1967–79)
 Ryan Shawcross (2007–21)
 Denis Smith (1968–82)
 Mike Pejic (1968–76)
 Stanley Matthews (1932–47) & (1961–65)
 Alan Hudson (1974–76) & (1984–85)
 Jimmy Greenhoff (1969–76)
 Peter Hoekstra (2001–04)
 Mark Stein (1991–93) & (1996–97)
 Ricardo Fuller (2006–12)

Bench
 Asmir Begović (2010–2015)
 Lee Dixon (1986–88)
 Neil Franklin (1939–50) 
 Terry Conroy (1967–79)
 John Ritchie (1962–66) & (1969–75)

Manager
 Tony Waddington (1960–77)

English Football Hall of Fame members
A number of Stoke City players have been inducted into the English Football Hall of Fame:

  Gordon Banks (2002 inductee)
  Stanley Matthews (2002 inductee)
  Peter Shilton (2002 inductee)
  Geoff Hurst (2004 inductee)

Football League 100 Legends
The Football League 100 Legends is a list of "100 legendary football players" produced by The Football League in 1998, to celebrate the 100th season of League football.

  Gordon Banks
  Neil Franklin
  Geoff Hurst
  Stanley Matthews
  Jimmy McIlroy
  Peter Shilton
  Neville Southall

PFA Team of the Year
The following have been included in the PFA Team of the Year whilst playing for Stoke :
 1975  Peter Shilton,  Alan Hudson (1st tier)
 1976  Alan Hudson (1st tier)
 1979  Mike Doyle,  Howard Kendall (2nd tier)
 1986  Keith Bertschin (2nd tier)
 1986  Lee Dixon (2nd tier)
 1991  Wayne Biggins (3rd tier)
 1992  Vince Overson,  Wayne Biggins (3rd tier)
 1993  Vince Overson,  Mark Stein (3rd tier)
 1997  Mike Sheron (2nd tier)
 1999  Graham Kavanagh (3rd tier)
 2000  Graham Kavanagh (3rd tier)
 2001  Graham Kavanagh (3rd tier)
 2008  Ryan Shawcross,  Liam Lawrence,  Ricardo Fuller (2nd tier)

Managerial records

 First full-time manager: Thomas Slaney who was in charge for nine years (1874 to 1883)
 Longest serving manager: Tony Waddington 17 years (764 matches) (June 1960 to March 1977)

Team records

Matches
 First recorded match: Stoke Ramblers 1–1 E.W Mays XV, Friendly, 17 October 1868
 First match at the Victoria Ground: Stoke 2–1 Talke Rangers, Friendly, 28 March 1878
 First FA Cup match: Stoke 1–2 Manchester, First Round, 10 November 1883
 First Football League match: Stoke 0–2 West Bromwich Albion, 8 September 1888
 First League Cup match: Stoke City 1–3 Doncaster Rovers, Second Round, 18 October 1960
 First European match: Stoke City 3–1 Kaiserslautern, First Round, 13 September 1972
 Last match at Victoria Ground: Stoke City 2–1 West Bromwich Albion, Division One, 4 May 1997
 First match at the Britannia Stadium: Stoke City 1–1 Rochdale, League Cup, 1st Round 2nd Leg, 27 August 1997
 First League match at the Britannia Stadium: Stoke City 1–2 Swindon Town, Division One, 30 August 1997
 First match in the Premier League: Bolton Wanderers 3–1 Stoke City, 18 August 2008

Record wins
 Record win: 26–0 v Mow Cop, Staffordshire Senior Cup, 1877
 Record League Win: 10–3 v West Bromwich Albion, First Division, 4 February 1937
 Record Premier League Win: 6–1 v Liverpool, 24 May 2015
 Record FA Cup Win: 11–0 v Stourbridge, First Round, 26 September 1914
 Record League Cup Win: 6–2 v Chelsea, Third Round, 22 October 1974
 Record home Win: 9–0 v Plymouth Argyle, Second Division, 17 December 1960
 Record away Win: 6–0 v Bury, Second Division, 13 March 1954

Record defeats
 Record League defeat: 0–10 v Preston North End, Football League, 14 September 1889
 Record Premier League defeat: 0–7 v Chelsea, Premier League, 25 April 2010
 Record FA Cup defeat: 0–8 v Wolverhampton Wanderers, Quarter Final, 22 February 1890
 Record League Cup defeat: 0–8 v Liverpool, Fourth Round, 24 November 2000
 Record home defeat: 0–7 v Birmingham City, First Division, 10 January 1998
 Record away defeat: 0–10 v Preston North End, Football League, 14 September 1889

Sequences
 Longest sequence of League wins: 8 (30 March 1895 – 21 September 1895)
 Longest sequence of League defeats: 11 (6 April 1985 – 17 August 1985)
 Longest sequence of League draws: 5 (1 September 1973 – 15 September 1973), (21 March 1987 – 11 April 1987), (12 August 2006 – 12 September 2006)
 Longest unbeaten run: 25 (5 September 1992 – 20 February 1993)
 Longest run without a win: 17 (15 September 1984 – 22 December 1984), (22 April 1989 – 14 October 1989)
 Longest run without a draw: 46 (30 March 1895 – 14 November 1896)
 Longest successive scoring run: 21 (24 December 1921 – 22 April 1922)
 Longest successive non-scoring run: 8 (29 December 1984 – 16 March 1985)
 Longest run without a clean sheet: 34 (22 December 1888 – 3 October 1891)
 Longest run of clean sheets: 7 (6 November 2006 – 9 December 2006) achieved by Steve Simonsen

Attendances
 Record League attendance at the Victoria Ground: 51,380 v Arsenal, 29 March 1937
 Record FA Cup attendance at the Victoria Ground: 50,736 v Bolton Wanderers, 2 March 1946
 Record League attendance at the Bet365 Stadium: 30,022 v Everton (17 March 2018)
 Record League Cup attendance at the Bet365 Stadium: 27,109 v Liverpool, 29 November 2000
 Record FA Cup attendance at the Bet365 Stadium: 28,218 v Everton, 5 January 2002
 Record away attendance: 84,569 v Manchester City 3 March 1934

Season-by-season performance

Stoke City F.C. in Europe

References

Books 
 Lowe, Simon: "Stoke City The Modern Era – A Complete Record" (Desert Island Books)
 Matthews, Tony: "The Encyclopedia of Stoke City " (Lion Press, 1994,

External links
 Stoke City History
 Stoke City Honours
 Stoke City Records

Stoke City
Records and Statistics